The Permanent Council was the highest deliberative body of the Russian Empire, established on April 11, 1801 and abolished in 1810; predecessor of the State Council.

It consisted of twelve representatives of the titled nobility under the emperor Alexander I (representatives were Dmitry Troshchinsky, Pyotr Zavadovsky, Alexander Vorontsov, Platon Zubov and Valerian Zubov, and others), the chairman was Count Nikolai Saltykov.

The council could protest the actions and Ukases of the emperor. At the beginning of its activities, the Permanent Council considered a number of important issues and prepared several reforms, including a Decree on Free Ploughmen.

With the establishment of ministries and the Committee of Ministers in 1802, insignificant and intricate cases came to the consideration of the Permanent Council, and after the establishment of the State Council, the Permanent Council was finally abolished.

See also
Private Committee

Sources

"Decree “On the Establishment of an Permanent Council for Considering Important State Affairs"

References

External links
 Emperor Alexander I

Government of the Russian Empire
Organizations established in 1801
1810 disestablishments